Triton Stadium is a football stadium in the town of Kaimana, Kaimana Regency, West Papua, Indonesia. The stadium has a capacity of 5,000 people.

It is the home base of Perseka Kaimana .

References

Buildings and structures in West Papua (province)
Sports venues in Indonesia
Football venues in Indonesia
Multi-purpose stadiums in Indonesia